ESI or Esi may refer to:

Science and technology
 Earth Similarity Index
 Electrospray ionization, a technique used in mass spectrometry 
 Environmental Seismic Intensity scale
 Essential Science Indicators, by Clarivate
 Electronic supplementary information, in scientific publications; for example see coordination polymerization

Computing
 Edge Side Includes, a markup language
 Electronically stored information (Federal Rules of Civil Procedure)
 Enclosure Services Interface, a computer protocol used in SCSI enclosures
 Enterprise Southbridge Interface, a motherboard interface
 ESI register, in the x86 microprocessor architecture

Medicine
 Electromagnetic source imaging
 Emergency Severity Index, a triage algorithm
 Epidural steroid injection

Organisations
 Electro Scientific Industries, an American high-technology company
 Employees' State Insurance, in India
 Ernst Strüngmann Institute, a German research institute
 Erwin Schrödinger International Institute for Mathematical Physics, in Austria
 Escadron spécial d'intervention, now the Belgian Federal Police Special Units
 European Stability Initiative, a think tank
 ITT Educational Services, owner of the defunct ITT Technical Institute

People
 Esi Awuah, Ghanaian academic
 Esi Benyarku (born 1976), Canadian sprinter
 Esi Edugyan (born 1978), Canadian novelist
 Esi Sutherland-Addy, Ghanaian academic
 Esikeli Tonga (born 1988), Australian rugby league player

Other uses
 Enhanced Station Initiative, of the New York City Subway
 Enlightened self-interest, a philosophy in ethics
 Environmental Sustainability Index
 Ethical Sensory Introvert, in socionics
 Export substitution industrialization
 Early supplier involvement, an aspect of supplier integration in supply chain management; see Design for X
 North Alaskan Inupiatun language (ISO 639-3 code)